KHVJ-LP (95.3 FM) was a low-power FM radio station licensed to Oklahoma City, Oklahoma, United States. The station was owned by Iglesia De Restauraction, El Monte De Los Olivos.

History
The station was assigned the call sign KHVJ-LP on February 17, 2014. KHVJ-LP's license was cancelled by the Federal Communications Commission on June 27, 2018, due to the station having been silent since October 1, 2016.

References

External links
 

HVJ-LP
HVJ-LP
Radio stations established in 2014
2014 establishments in Oklahoma
Defunct radio stations in the United States
Radio stations disestablished in 2018
2018 disestablishments in Oklahoma
Defunct religious radio stations in the United States
HVJ-LP